Thangool Airport  is an airport at 42 Aerodrome Road, Thangool, Shire of Banana, Queensland, Australia. It is also known as Thangool Aerodrome. It is operated by the Banana Shire Council.

Airlines and destinations

See also
 List of airports in Queensland

References

Airports in Queensland
Shire of Banana
Buildings and structures in Central Queensland